Down The Rabbit Hole (DTRH) is a three-day music festival that takes place in the Groene Heuvels leisure area in the village of Ewijk (near Nijmegen) in the Netherlands. It was first organized in 2014 and has since been held annually late June or early July.

Like Lowlands it is organized by Mojo Concerts and marketed as a competitor to Best Kept Secret. The first edition was attended by around 10,000 people and nominated for two European Festival Awards. The three main stages – "Hotot", "Fuzzy Lop", and "Teddy Widder" – are named after rabbit breeds.

 The 2014 edition saw Damon Albarn, The Black Keys, and Foals as headliners.
 The 2015 edition had Damien Rice, Iggy Pop, and The War on Drugs play.
 In 2016 the festival was headlined by PJ Harvey, The National, and Anohni.
 The 2017 edition was headlined by Moderat, Fleet Foxes, and Oscar and the Wolf.
 In 2018 Queens of the Stone Age, Anderson .Paak & The Free Nationals, and Nick Cave and the Bad Seeds headlined the festival.
 In 2019 Editors, Underworld and Janelle Monáe played as headliner.

In 2020 and 2021 the festival couldn't take place because of the coronavirus pandemic in the Netherlands.

 In 2022 Disclosure, Gorillaz and The War on Drugs were the main acts.

External links

References 

Music festivals in the Netherlands
Music festivals established in 2014
2014 establishments in the Netherlands
Beuningen